Menagerie is the sixth studio album by American R&B singer Bill Withers, released on October 29, 1977 through the Columbia label.

Reception

Menagerie is overall more uptempo and less introspective in feel than Withers' previous albums.  None of the songs tackle intensely personal emotions of the kind which lent a dark edge to earlier Withers tracks such as "Use Me", "Better Off Dead" or "Who Is He (And What Is He to You)".  The arrangements are also generally upbeat and breezy, with "I Want to Spend the Night" and "Tender Things" having a distinct Latin feel, and "Lovely Night for Dancing" and "She Wants To (Get On Down)" showing disco influences.  The lead single "Lovely Day" has gone on to become one of Withers' signature songs, particularly in the UK, where it was a top 10 hit both on its original release and again in a remixed version in 1988.

Menagerie peaked at #16 on the R&B chart and #39 on the Billboard 200.  It was Withers' biggest-selling album in the UK, where it reached #27.

Track listing

Personnel 
 Bill Withers – lead vocals (1-9), backing vocals (1-4, 6-9), guitar (2), keyboards (3)
 Ray Parker Jr. – guitar (1, 4-7)
 Clarence McDonald – keyboards (1, 4, 6, 7, 9), string arrangements (1, 6, 8), horn arrangements (6, 8), arrangements (7)
 Dean Gant – keyboards (2)
 Clifford Coulter – keyboards (5, 8), synthesizer solo (8)
 Mike Jones – synthesizers (6)
 Jerry Knight – bass (1, 4, 6)
 Keni Burke – bass (2, 3, 5, 7, 8, 9)
 Russ Kunkel – drums (1, 2, 7, 8, 9), shaker (1)
 Alvin Taylor – drums (3-6)
 Ralph MacDonald – percussion (1-4, 6-9)
 Paul Riser – horn arrangements (2-4, 9) string arrangements (2-5, 9)
 Charles Veal – concertmaster (1-4, 6-9)
 Pat Hodges – backing vocals (5)
 Denita James – backing vocals (5)
 Jessica Smith – backing vocals (5)

Production 
 Bill Withers – producer (1-9)
 Clarence McDonald – producer (1, 4, 6, 7, 9)
 Keni Burke – producer (2, 3, 5)
 Clifford Coulter – producer (8)
 Bob Merritt – engineer
 Phil Jantaas – assistant engineer 
 Roger Carpenter – design 
 Lou Beach – illustration
 Elliot Gilbert – photography

Charts

Weekly charts

Year-end charts

Singles

External links
 Bill Withers-Menagerie at Discogs

References

1977 albums
Bill Withers albums
Albums arranged by Paul Riser
Columbia Records albums